Samal Saeed Mujbel Al Mamoori (born 1 December 1987) is an Iraqi football defender who plays for Al-Diwaniya SC and the Iraq national football team.

Personal
Samal is the twin brother of the Iraqi midfielder Samer Saeed and the older brother of Iraqi defender Sameh Saeed.

International goals
Scores and results list Iraq's goal tally first.

Honours

Club
Erbil SC
 Iraqi Premier League: 2007–08, 2008–09
Al-Quwa Al-Jawiya
 AFC Cup: 2016, 2017
 Iraq FA Cup: 2015–16
 Iraqi Premier League: 2016–17

Country
 2005 West Asian Games Gold medallist.
 2012 Arab Nations Cup Bronze medallist
 2012 WAFF Championship: runner-up

Individual
 15/16 IPL Center Back of the season

References

External links
 

Iraqi footballers
Iraq international footballers
Living people
1987 births
2011 AFC Asian Cup players
Foolad FC players
Al-Shorta SC players
Association football defenders
AFC Cup winning players